Mubarak Al-Kabeer City is an area in Kuwait. The Mubarak Al-Kabeer governorate is named after the area.

Districts of Mubarak Al-Kabeer Governorate
Populated places in Kuwait